Santa Ana is a small city and municipal seat of Santa Ana Municipality in the Mexican state of Sonora. The town had a 2005 census population of 10,593 inhabitants.

History
This settlement originated when the Pimas (indigenous people in northwest Mexico) settled in the area now called Santa Ana Viejo attracted by the mission established by the Jesuits. The present town of Santa Ana was founded by Diego A. Moreno in the year 1883, when the Sonoran Railroad was being built in this area of the state. Santa Ana achieved the status of a municipality in 1935. The movie The Fast and The Furious was filmed throughout the months of June and July, 2008, in Santa Ana as well as Magdalena de Kino, Sonora.

The main tourist attraction in Santa Ana is the church built in the 1900s to honor Our Lady of Saint Ana. Every year during the month of July, the whole town celebrates the day of their Saint with a fair and dances.

Economic activity
Agriculture is an important economic activity with the main crops being wheat, corn, vegetables, and grasses for cattle fodder.  
Another important economic activity is cattle raising with over 20,000 head counted in the 2000 census.  Calves are exported to the United States of America.  

The industrial sector is small but one maquiladora plant alone employs around 800 workers.

References
Link to tables of population data from Census of 2005 INEGI: Instituto Nacional de Estadística, Geografía e Informática
Sonora Enciclopedia de los Municipios de México

External links 
Santa Ana, Ayuntamiento Digital (Official Website of Santa Ana, Sonora)

Photographs

Populated places in Sonora
Populated places in the Sonoran Desert of Mexico